The list of ship launches in 1955 includes a chronological list of all ships launched in 1955.



References

1955
Ship launches